Blythe  is a city in eastern Riverside County, California, United States. Blythe was named after Thomas Henry Blythe, a San Francisco financier, who established primary water rights to the Colorado River in the region in 1877. The city was incorporated on July 21, 1916. The population was 18,317 at the 2020 census.

History

Etymology

Blythe was named after Thomas Henry Blythe, a San Francisco businessman and entrepreneur. Mr. Blythe established primary water rights to the Colorado River in the southwestern California region in 1877.  The town was originally named Blythe City, by Thomas Blythe himself, but the name was shortened to simply Blythe around the time the first post office was opened in 1908.

Early years

In the early or mid-1870s, William Calloway (known as Oliver Calloway in some sources), an engineer and a former captain of the 1st California Infantry Regiment, explored an area across the Colorado River from Ehrenberg, Arizona, and found its potential for development. Calloway made preliminary surveys and filed land claims under the Swamp Land Act of 1850. He interested the wealthy San Francisco Capitalist Thomas Henry Blythe (originally born Thomas Williams in Mold, Wales) to undertake development and settlement of an "empire" located next to the Colorado.   Together they purchased a total of 140,000 acres under the Swamp Land Act, and another 35,000 acres under the Desert Land Act of 1877.

On July 17, 1877, Blythe filed his first claim for Colorado River water on what was to become the "Blythe Intake". Blythe appointed another man named George Irish as manager to assist Calloway in building an irrigation system. Calloway died in a Chemehuevi attack on March 28, 1880, and was replaced by C.C. Miller, the father of Frank Augustus Miller. Thomas Blythe died on April 4, 1883; his only revisit to the valley was in November 1882. After his death, the work in the valley halted and Blythe's estate subsequently went into litigation between his illegitimate daughter Florence and other claimants, the trial beginning in 1889. In the 1900s, Florence was awarded the estate, after several years of preceding rulings in favor of her and appeals against her.

20th century
Frank Murphy and Ed Williams, who were involved with the cattle industry in southeastern Arizona, came to the area in 1904 and were convinced it was well-suited for cattle and farming. With the Hobson brothers from Ventura County, they bought Blythe's estate and formed the Palo Verde Land and Water Company. During 1911–1912, W.F. Holt, who helped develop nearby Imperial Valley, was the company's general manager.

On August 8, 1916, the California Southern Railroad reached Blythe from the desert station of Rice, then known as Blythe Junction. It was later renamed to honor G.W. Rice, an engineer and superintendent of the railroad. The dramatic growth in the valley following this event attracted national attention. Production totals increased annually from virtually nothing to near $8,000,000 in few years, primarily from cotton and cotton seed shipped to the ports. The lower cotton prices in 1920 ended this prosperous time. The Atchison, Topeka and Santa Fe Railway began leasing the line in 1921 and acquired it at the end of 1942.

The first automobile bridge over the Colorado River between Blythe and Ehrenberg was constructed in 1928 to replace a cable ferry service. The bridge's successor was built in the early 1960s and was expanded to four lanes and a pedestrian walkway in early 1974.

In 1935, the completion of Boulder Dam extinguished the annual destructive floods in the valley. As noted during the city's fiftieth anniversary, some forty crops were grown on the farms, and large cattle feeds were another aspect of the agriculture industry. As of 1947, the Fisher ranch had the biggest herd of registered Brahman cattle in California, the breeding stock having been sold to western states and other countries.

During World War II, Blythe was the site of United States Army Air Forces facilities at the Blythe Airport and the Gary Field.

In 1972, Interstate 10 was built through the city, replacing US 60 and the previously decommissioned US 70 on Hobsonway as the main thoroughfare.

21st century
In 2016, the voter-approved recreational use of cannabis in California has made the cannabis industry drawn to the economically declined city due to lower land prices, water, and potentially lower taxes compared to other parts of the state.

Geography and climate
Blythe is located near the California/Arizona border in the Colorado Desert section of the Sonoran Desert, at the junction of Interstate 10 and US 95.

Nearby communities include Vidal to the north, Ripley to the south, Desert Center to the west, and Ehrenberg, Arizona, to the east. Major cities in the region include Yuma (85 miles), Indio (95 miles), Phoenix (150 miles), San Bernardino (170 miles), Riverside (172 miles), and Las Vegas (200 miles). Blythe is within 4 hours via car of 10% of the United States' population.

Blythe has a hot desert climate, featuring extremely hot summers and mild winters. But on June 20, 2016, that long-standing record was shattered when Blythe reached . There are an average of 16 days with measurable precipitation.

There are an average of 17 days with measurable precipitation.

Average seasonal temperatures:

Also notable is the geological history of Blythe – despite California's reputation for earthquakes, according to geologists Blythe has not had an earthquake centered in the city for over 500,000 years.

Local features
Tourism is a major component of the local economy. Blythe is a stopover city with full services for travelers between any of the nearby regions, in particular the major cities of Los Angeles and Phoenix, since it is approximately midway between those two metropolitan areas. The winter months bring visitors avoiding the colder climates of the north, when the population of the area within 50 miles (80 km) of Blythe has been known to exceed 500,000.

XPO Logistics freight has a large facility here. It is used mainly at night for cross dock operations, as there is seldom a need to make deliveries here.

Blythe also contains 24 churches, one library, two newspapers (Palo Verde Valley Times, The Desert Independent), two museums, two radio stations (KERU-FM and KJMB-FM ), three banks, a three-screen movie theater (now closed), one funeral home and an 18,500 sq ft (1,720 m2). recreation center. The area is popular with campers and hikers and has six parks, seven campgrounds, seven RV parks, 3 boat ramps onto the Colorado River, and an 18-hole public golf course.

Blythe hosts the Blythe Blue Grass Festival annually the third weekend of January.

Dove hunting is popular in Blythe. The hunting season starts every September 1.

Demographics

2010
The 2010 United States Census reported that Blythe had a population of 20,817. The racial makeup of Blythe was 12,396 (59.5%) White (28.3% Non-Hispanic White), 3,126 (15.0%) African American, 243 (1.2%) Native American, 319 (1.5%) Asian, 32 (0.2%) Pacific Islander, 4,045 (19.4%) from other races, and 656 (3.2%) from two or more races. Hispanic or Latino of any race were 11,068 persons (53.2%).

The Census reported that 12,972 people (62.3% of the population) lived in households, 82 (0.4%) lived in non-institutionalized group quarters, and 7,763 (37.3%) were institutionalized.

There were 4,513 households, out of which 1,972 (43.7%) had children under the age of 18 living in them, 1,995 (44.2%) were opposite-sex married couples living together, 855 (18.9%) had a female householder with no husband present, 344 (7.6%) had a male householder with no wife present. There were 396 (8.8%) unmarried opposite-sex partnerships, and 24 (0.5%) same-sex married couples or partnerships. 1,071 households (23.7%) were made up of individuals, and 367 (8.1%) had someone living alone who was 65 years of age or older. The average household size was 2.87. There were 3,194 families (70.8% of all households); the average family size was 3.41.

The population was spread out, with 4,157 people (20.0%) under the age of 18, 1,770 people (8.5%) aged 18 to 24, 7,332 people (35.2%) aged 25 to 44, 5,764 people (27.7%) aged 45 to 64, and 1,794 people (8.6%) who were 65 years of age or older. The median age was 38.0 years. For every 100 females, there were 218.1 males. For every 100 females age 18 and over, there were 268.1 males.

The homeowner vacancy rate was 4.0%; the rental vacancy rate was 10.3%. 6,913 people (33.2% of the population) lived in owner-occupied housing units and 6,059 people (29.1%) lived in rental housing units.

According to the 2010 United States Census, Blythe had a median household income of $48,327, with 16.1% of the population living below the federal poverty line.

A large portion of the city's population are inmates in the Chuckawalla Valley and Ironwood State Prisons. Both hold up to 3,000 prisoners each.

2000
As of the census of 2000, there were 12,155 people, 4,103 households, and 2,974 families residing in the city. The racial makeup of the city was 55.4% White, 8.3% Black or African American, 1.4% Native American, 1.4% Asian, 0.2% Pacific Islander, 28.8% from other races, and 4.5% from two or more races. 45.8% of the population were Hispanic or Latino of any race.

There were 4,103 households, out of which 41.4% had children under the age of 18 living with them, 50.0% were married couples living together, 16.6% had a female householder with no husband present, and 27.5% were non-families. 22.9% of all households were made up of individuals, and 7.1% had someone living alone who was 65 years of age or older. The average household size was 2.91 and the average family size was 3.45.

In the city, the population was spread out, with 33.9% under the age of 18, 8.7% from 18 to 24, 28.4% from 25 to 44, 19.0% from 45 to 64, and 9.9% who were 65 years of age or older. The median age was 31 years. For every 100 females, there were 99.2 males. For every 100 females age 18 and over, there were 97.0 males.

The median income for a household in the city was $35,324, and the median income for a family was $40,783. Males had a median income of $32,342 versus $26,671 for females. The per capita income for the city was $14,424. About 19.0% of families and 20.9% of the population were below the poverty line, including 24.9% of those under age 18 and 21.6% of those age 65 or over.

Politics

Sports
The Blythe Heat was a winter professional minor league baseball team of the Arizona Winter League, and also a member of the Arizona Summer League, but the leagues folded in 2017. They play on Alexander Field in Todd Park facing the Palo Verde College. Some games of the Lake Havasu Heat (folded in 2009) of the semi-pro Pacific Southwest Baseball League played in Blythe during the summer months.

Public services

State and federal agencies
State facilities in the town include the following:
 Resources Agency, California Department of Fish and Game office at 150 S. Main Street.
 California Highway Patrol office at 430 S. Broadway Street.
 California Department of Motor Vehicles office at 430 S. Broadway Street.
 California Department of Food and Agriculture office.
 California Department of Corrections and Rehabilitation – Chuckawalla Valley State Prison
 California Department of Corrections and Rehabilitation – Ironwood State Prison
 California Department of Forestry and Fire Protection

Federal facilities in the town include the following:
 U.S. Border Patrol
 U.S. Department of Agriculture – Blythe Federal Building
 U.S. Postal Service – Blythe Federal Building

Safety
Blythe has its own police department and volunteer fire department. The Riverside County Sheriff's Department also has a regional station in Blythe.

Emergency medical services are provided by American Medical Response, which staffs two paramedic ambulances in the city 24 hours a day.

Education
Blythe area public elementary and secondary schools comprise the Palo Verde Unified School District, which contains 3 elementary schools and 1 high school, and continuation/adult education school. Palo Verde Community College District is part of the California Community College system and includes Palo Verde College in Blythe and an educational center in Needles. As of 2012, there is one private non-profit school, The Desert Learning Center, for grades K-8.

Transportation
Interstate 10 crosses Blythe in an east–west direction. State Route 78's eastern terminus is west of the town. U.S. Route 95 crosses Blythe in the eastern side. Lovekin Boulevard and Midland Road serve the ghost town of Midland.

Blythe Airport (BLH) is just west of the town on Interstate 10 and has a  runway.

Blythe was served in rail by the Arizona and California Railroad but currently has no rail service since an embargo in late 2007 and abandonment in 2009.

Blythe is served by Palo Verde Valley Transit Agency. Greyhound stops in Blythe.

Healthcare
Health facilities in Blythe include Palo Verde Hospital, a General Acute Care Hospital with 55 total beds and 24-hour standby emergency services, 23 physicians/surgeons, 2 dentists, 2 optometrists, 1 chiropractor, and 1 podiatrist.

Cemetery
The Palo Verde Cemetery District maintains the Palo Verde Cemetery.

Local law enforcement
Blythe has its own police department, the Blythe Police Department who patrol Blythe. However the highways in and around Blythe are managed by California Highway Patrol  and the nearby Riverside County patrolled by Riverside County Sheriff's Department who also run the county jail.

See also

 Blythe Intaglios
 Blythe Photovoltaic Power Plant
 Blythe Solar Power Project

References

Further reading

External links

 

 
Populated places established in 1916
Populated places in the Colorado Desert
Communities in the Lower Colorado River Valley
Lower Colorado River Valley
Sonoran Desert
Cities in Riverside County, California
Incorporated cities and towns in California
1916 establishments in California
California populated places on the Colorado River